This page is a list of topics in ancient philosophy.

A
Abas (sophist)
- Abderites
- Academic skepticism
- Academy
- Acatalepsy
- Acrion
- Active intellect
- Actus et potentia
- Acumenus
- Adiaphora
- Adrastus of Aphrodisias
- Adrianus
- Aedesia
- Aedesius
- Aeneas of Gaza
- Aenesidemus
- Aesara
- Aeschines of Neapolis
- Aether (classical element)
- Aetius (philosopher)
- Agapius of Athens
- Agathobulus
- Agathosthenes
- Agrippa the Skeptic
- Akrasia
- Al-Khazini
- Albinus (philosopher)
- Alcinous (philosopher)
- Alcmaeon of Croton
- Alexamenus of Teos
- Alexander of Aegae
- Alexander of Aphrodisias
- Alexandrian school
- Alexicrates
- Alexinus
- Allegory of the Cave
- Amafinius
- Amelius
- Amicus Plato, sed magis amica veritas
- Ammonius Hermiae
- Ammonius Saccas
- Ammonius of Alexandria (Christian philosopher)
- Ammonius of Athens
- Amynomachus
- Anacharsis
- Analects
- Analogy of the divided line
- Anamnesis (philosophy)
- Athanasius of Alexandria
- Anaxagoras
- Anaxarchus
- Anaxilaus
- Anaximander
- Anaximenes of Miletus
- Ancient commentators project
- Ancient Egyptian philosophy
- Ancient Greek philosophy
- Ancient philosophy
- Ancient Philosophy (journal)
- Androcydes (Pythagorean)
- Andronicus of Rhodes
- Anima mundi (spirit)
- Anniceris
- Antigone (Sophocles)
- Antiochus of Ascalon
- Antipater of Cyrene
- Antipater of Tarsus
- Antiperistasis
- Antiphon (person)
- Antisthenes
- Antoninus (philosopher)
- Apatheia
- Apeiron (cosmology)
- Apodicticity
- Apollodorus the Epicurean
- Apollodorus of Seleucia
- Apollonian and Dionysian
- Apollonius Cronus
- Apollonius of Tyre (philosopher)
- Apology (Plato)
- Apology (Xenophon)
- Apology of Aristides
- Aponia
- Aporia
- Aporime
- Apuleius
- Arab transmission of the Classics to the West
- Arcesilaus
- Arche
- Archedemus of Tarsus
- Archelaus (philosopher)
- Archestratus (music theorist)
- Archimedes
- Archytas
- Arete
- Arete of Cyrene
- Arignote
- Arimneste
- Aristides of Athens
- Aristion
- Aristippus
- Aristippus the Younger
- Aristo of Alexandria
- Aristo of Ceos
- Aristo of Chios
- Aristobulus of Paneas
- Aristoclea
- Aristocles of Messene
- Aristocreon
- Aristonymus
- Aristotelian ethics
- Aristotelian physics
- Aristotelian view of a god
- Aristotelianism
- Aristotle
- Aristotle of Cyrene
- Aristotle of Mytilene
- Aristotle for Everybody
- Aristotle the Dialectician
- Aristotle's theory of universals
- Aristotle's views on women
- Aristotle's wheel paradox
- Aristoxenus
- Arius
- Arius Didymus
- Arnouphis
- Arrian
- Ars Poetica (Horace)
- Asclepiades of Phlius
- Asclepiades the Cynic
- Asclepigenia
- Asclepiodotus (philosopher)
- Asclepiodotus of Alexandria
- Asclepius of Tralles
- Aspasius
- Assertoric
- Ataraxia
- Athenaeus of Seleucia
- Athenodoros Cordylion
- Athenodorus of Soli
- Attalus (Stoic)
- Atticus (philosopher)
- Titus Pomponius Atticus
- Auctoritas
- Augoeides
- Augustine of Hippo
- Aulus Egnatius Priscillianus
- Axiochus (dialogue)
- Axiothea of Phlius

B
Quintus Lucilius Balbus
- Banausos
- Barba non facit philosophum
- Basilides (Stoic)
- Basilides the Epicurean
- Batis of Lampsacus
- Becoming (philosophy)
- Being
- Bhagavad Gita
- Bion of Borysthenes
- Blossius
- Boethius
- Boethus of Sidon
- Boethus of Sidon (Stoic)
- Bolus of Mendes
- Brontinus
- Bryson of Achaea
- Bryson of Heraclea

C
Calcidius
- Calippus of Syracuse
- Callicles
- Calliphon
- Calliphon of Croton
- Callippus
- Callistratus (sophist)
- Athenodoros Cananites
- Cappadocian Fathers
- Cardinal virtues
- Carneades
- Carneiscus
- Cassius Longinus (philosopher)
- Categoriae decem
- Categories (Aristotle)
- Catius
- Cato Maior de Senectute
- Cato the Elder
- Cato the Younger
- Cebes
- Celestial spheres
- Celsus
- Cercidas
- Cercops
- Chaeremon of Alexandria
- Chaerephon
- Chaeron of Pellene
- Chaldean Oracles
- Chamaeleon (philosopher)
- Chanakya
- Chandragomin
- Chance (Ancient Greek concept)
- Chariot Allegory
- Charmadas
- Charmides (dialogue)
- Chion of Heraclea
- Choricius of Gaza
- Chrysanthius
- Chrysippus
- Chunyu Kun
- Cicero
- City of God (book)
- Classical theism
- Classics
- Cleanthes
- Clearchus of Soli
- Cleinias of Tarentum
- Clement of Alexandria
- Cleobulus
- Cleomedes
- Cleomenes the Cynic
- Clinamen
- Clinomachus
- Clitophon (dialogue)
- Colotes
- Commentaria in Aristotelem Graeca
- Commentaries on Aristotle
- Commentaries on Plato
- Confucius
- Consolatio Literary Genre
- Constitution of the Athenians
- Contra Celsum
- Coriscus of Scepsis
- Lucius Annaeus Cornutus
- Corpus Aristotelicum
- Theognostus of Alexandria
- Theophilos Corydalleus
- Theosophy (history of philosophy)
- Crantor
- Crates of Athens
- Crates of Mallus
- Crates of Thebes
- Cratippus of Pergamon
- Cratylism
- Cratylus
- Cratylus (dialogue)
- Crescens the Cynic
- Crinis
- Critias (dialogue)
- Crito
- Critolaus
- Cronius the Pythagorean
- Cultural influence of Plato's Republic
- Cyclic history
- Cynic
- Cynic epistles
- Cyrenaics
- Cyropaedia

D
Daemon (classical mythology)
- Damascius
- Damis
- Damo (philosopher)
- Dardanus of Athens
- David (commentator)
- De Brevitate Vitae (Seneca)
- De Coelesti Hierarchia
- De Divinatione
- De Interpretatione
- De Providentia
- De Vita Beata
- De Legibus
- De Mysteriis Aegyptiorum
- De Natura Deorum
- De Officiis
- De finibus bonorum et malorum
- De re publica
- De rerum natura
- Decline of Greco-Roman polytheism
- Demetrius Lacon
- Demetrius of Phalerum
- Demetrius of Amphipolis
- Demetrius the Cynic
- Demiurge
- Democrates
- Democritus
- Demodocus (dialogue)
- Demonax
- Derveni papyrus
- Dexippus (philosopher)
- Diagoras of Melos
- Diairesis
- Dialogue of Pessimism
- Dianoia
- Dicaearchus
- Dictum de omni et nullo
- Dignitas (Roman concept)
- Dio Chrysostom
- Dio of Alexandria
- Diocles of Cnidus
- Diodorus Cronus
- Diodorus of Adramyttium
- Diodorus of Aspendus
- Diodorus of Tyre
- Diodotus the Stoic
- Diogenes of Apollonia
- Diogenes of Babylon
- Diogenes Laërtius
- Diogenes of Oenoanda
- Diogenes of Seleucia (Epicurean)
- Diogenes of Sinope
- Diogenes of Tarsus
- Dionysius of Cyrene
- Dionysius the Renegade
- Dionysius of Chalcedon
- Dionysius of Lamptrai
- Diotima of Mantinea
- Diotimus the Stoic
- Disciples of Confucius
- Disciples of Plotinus
- Discourses of Epictetus
- Dissoi logoi
- Divine apathy
- Domninus of Larissa
- Doxa
- Doxography
- Dulce et decorum est pro patria mori
- Dunamis
- Dyad (Greek philosophy)
- Dynamics of the celestial spheres

E
Early life of Plato
- Echecrates
- Economics (Aristotle)
- Ecphantus the Pythagorean
- Eikasia
- Ekpyrôsis
- Eleatics
- Elias (commentator)
- Ellopion of Peparethus
- Emanationism
- Empedocles
- Enchiridion of Epictetus
- Endoxa
- Energeia
- Ephesian school
- Epicharmus of Kos
- Epictetus
- Epicureanism
- Epicurus
- Epilogism
- Epimenides
- Epimenides paradox
- Epinomis
- Episteme
- Epistles (Plato)
- Epistulae morales ad Lucilium
- Epoché
- Erastus of Scepsis
- Eratosthenes
- Eretrian school
- Eryxias (dialogue)
- Essence
- Eternity of the world
- Euaeon of Lampsacus
- Eubulides
- Eubulus (banker)
- Euclid
- Euclid of Megara
- Eudaimonia
- Eudemian Ethics
- Eudemus of Rhodes
- Eudorus of Alexandria
- Eudoxus of Cnidus
- Euenus
- Euhemerus
- Euphantus
- Euphraeus
- Euphrates the Stoic
- Eupraxis
- Eurytus (Pythagorean)
- Eusebius of Myndus
- Eustathius of Cappadocia
- Euthydemus (dialogue)
- Euthymia (philosophy)
- Euthyphro
- Euthyphro dilemma
- Evander (philosopher)
- Evenus of Paros

F
Favorinus
- Han Fei
- Fifth Letter (Plato)
- First Alcibiades
- First Letter (Plato)
- Form of the Good
- Four causes
- Michael Frede
- Free will in antiquity

G
Gaius Marius Victorinus
- Gaius the Platonist
- Galen
- Galenic corpus
- Gaozi
- Gargi Vachaknavi
- Gaudapada
- Geminus
- Generation of Animals
- Genshin
- Ghosha
- Glaucon
- Glossary of Stoic terms
- Gnaeus Claudius Severus
- Gnaeus Claudius Severus Arabianus
- Gnosiology
- Golden mean (philosophy)
- Gongsun Long
- Gorgias
- Gorgias (dialogue)
- Gravitas
- Great Year
- Greek hero cult
- Gregory of Nyssa
- Gymnosophists

H
Hagnon of Tarsus
- Halcyon (dialogue)
- Han Feizi
- Han Yu
- Hecataeus of Abdera
- Hecato of Rhodes
- Hedone
- Hegesias of Cyrene
- Hegesias of Magnesia
- Hegesinus of Pergamon
- Hegias
- Heliodorus (philosopher)
- Heliodorus of Alexandria
- Hellenistic philosophy
- Hellenistic philosophy and Christianity
- Helvidius Priscus
- Henology
- Henosis
- Heraclides Lembus
- Heraclides of Aenus
- Heraclides Ponticus
- Heraclitus
- Heraclius the Cynic
- Herillus
- Hermagoras of Amphipolis
- Hermarchus
- Hermetica
- Hermeticism
- Hermias (philosopher)
- Hermias of Atarneus
- Herminus
- Hermippus of Smyrna
- Hermocrates (dialogue)
- Hermodorus
- Hermogenes (philosopher)
- Hermotimus of Clazomenae
- Hesiod
- Hestiaeus of Perinthus
- Hexis
- Hicetas
- Hierius
- Hiero (Xenophon)
- Hierocles (Stoic)
- Hierocles of Alexandria
- Hieronymus of Rhodes
- Himerius
- Hipparchia of Maroneia
- Hipparchus (dialogue)
- Hippasus
- Hippias
- Hippias Major
- Hippias Minor
- Hippo (philosopher)
- Hippocrates
- Hippocratic Oath
- History of Animals
- History of ethics in Ancient Greece
- Homer
- Homonoia
- Horror vacui (physics)
- Horus (athlete)
- Humanitas
- Hyle
- Hylomorphism
- Hypatia
- Hypostasis (Neoplatonism)
- Hypostasis (philosophy)

I
I know that I know nothing
- I Ching
- Iamblichus
- Ichthyas
- Idios kosmos
- Idomeneus of Lampsacus
- Illustrius Pusaeus
- Inherence
- Intellectualism
- Intellectual virtue
- Intelligible form
- Introduction to Arithmetic
- Ion (dialogue)
- Ion of Chios
- Ionian Enlightenment
- Ionian School (philosophy)
- Isagoge
- Isidore of Alexandria
- Isocrates
- Isonomia

J
Jason of Nysa
- Javelin argument
- Jayarāśi Bhaṭṭa
- Julian the Apostate
- Junius Rusticus
- Justin Martyr

K
Kalos kagathos
- Katalepsis
- Kathekon
- Kenoma
- Khôra
- Kitāb al-Hayawān (Aristotle)
- Clitomachus (philosopher)
- Know thyself
- Kūkai
- Kumārila Bhaṭṭa
- Kyklos

L
Laches (dialogue)
- Lacydes of Cyrene
- Laelius de Amicitia
- Laozi
- Lastheneia of Mantinea
- Law of contraries
- Law of excluded middle
- Law of identity
- Laws (dialogue)
- Lazy argument
- Legalism (Chinese philosophy)
- Leonteus of Lampsacus
- Leontion
- Leucippus
- Lexis (Aristotle)
- Liber de Causis
- Liezi
- Life of Apollonius of Tyana
- Linji school
- List of Cynic philosophers
- List of Epicurean philosophers
- List of speakers in Plato's dialogues
- List of Stoic philosophers
- List of ancient Greek philosophers
- List of ancient Platonists
- List of philosophers born in the centuries BC
- List of works by Lucian
- List of writers influenced by Aristotle
- Lives and Opinions of Eminent Philosophers
- Logos
- Longinus (literature)
- Lopamudra
- Ocellus Lucanus
- Lucian
- Lucretius
- Lyceum
- Lyceum (classical)
- Lyco of Iasos
- Lyco of Troas
- Lycophron (Sophist)
- Lysis (dialogue)
- Lysis of Taras

M
Ambrosius Theodosius Macrobius
- Macrocosm and microcosm
- Magna Moralia
- Magnanimity
- Mahavira
- Maieutics
- Maitreyi
- Malakia
- Proclus Mallotes
- Marcus Aurelius
- Marcus Favonius
- Marinus of Neapolis
- Material monism
- Material substratum
- Maximus of Ephesus
- Maximus of Tyre
- Claudius Maximus
- Mazdak
- Mechanics (Aristotle)
- Meditations
- Megalothymia and Isothymia
- Megarian school
- Meleager of Gadara
- Meletus
- Melissus of Samos
- Memorabilia (Xenophon)
- Mencius
- Mencius (book)
- Menedemus
- Menedemus of Pyrrha
- Menedemus the Cynic
- Menexenus (dialogue)
- Menippus
- Meno
- Meno's slave
- Messius Phoebus Severus
- Metakosmia
- Metaphor of the sun
- Metaphysics (Aristotle)
- Metaxy
- Metempsychosis
- Meteorology (Aristotle)
- Metrocles
- Metrodorus of Athens
- Metrodorus of Chios
- Metrodorus of Cos
- Metrodorus of Lampsacus (the elder)
- Metrodorus of Lampsacus (the younger)
- Metrodorus of Stratonicea
- Middle Platonism
- Milesian school
- Mimesis
- Mind's eye
- Minos (dialogue)
- Mnason of Phocis
- Mnesarchus of Athens
- Mochus
- Moderatus of Gades
- Mohism
- Monad (Greek philosophy)
- Monimus
- Monogenēs
- Moral status of animals in the ancient world
- Movement of Animals
- Mozi
- Musica universalis
- Myia
- Myson of Chenae
- Mystical philosophy of antiquity
- Myth of Er
- Mythos (Aristotle)

N
Nagarjuna
- Natural slavery
- Naturales quaestiones
- Nausiphanes
- Neleus of Scepsis
- Nemesius
- Neoplatonism
- Neoplatonism and Christianity
- Neoplatonism and Gnosticism
- Neopythagoreanism
- Nicarete of Megara
- Nicolaus of Damascus
- Nicomachean Ethics
- Nicomachus
- Nicomachus (son of Aristotle)
- Nigidius Figulus
- Ninth Letter (Plato)
- Non-Aristotelian logic
- Nous
- Numenius of Apamea
- Nyaya
- Nymphidianus of Smyrna

O
Oeconomicus
- Oenomaus of Gadara
- Olympiodorus the Elder
- Olympiodorus the Younger
- On Divination in Sleep
- On Dreams
- On Generation and Corruption
- On Indivisible Lines
- On Length and Shortness of Life
- On Marvellous Things Heard
- On Melissus, Xenophanes, and Gorgias
- On Memory
- On Nature (Anaximander)
- On Nature (Heraclitus)
- On Nature (Epicurus)
- On Nature (Parmenides)
- On Nature (Empedocles)
- On Plants
- On Sleep
- On the Heavens
- On the Soul
- On the Universe
- On Things Heard
- On Virtues and Vices
- On Youth, Old Age, Life and Death, and Respiration
- Onasander
- Onesicritus
- Onatas (philosopher)
- Organic unity
- Organon
- Origen
- Origen the Pagan
- Orphism (religion)
- Orthotes
- Ousia
- Gwilym Ellis Lane Owen

P
Paconius Agrippinus
- Paired opposites
- Palingenesis
- Pamprepius
- Panaetius
- Pancrates of Athens
- Panthoides
- Paradox of the Court
- Parmenides
- Parrhesia
- Parts of Animals
- Pasicles of Thebes
- Passive intellect
- Patañjali
- Pathos
- Patro the Epicurean
- Paulus Persa
- Pelagius
- Peregrinus Proteus
- Perictione
- Peripatetic school
- Peritrope
- Persaeus
- Personal life of Marcus Tullius Cicero
- Peter the Iberian
- Phaedo
- Phaedo of Elis
- Phaedrus the Epicurean
- Phaleas of Chalcedon
- Phanias of Eresus
- Phanto of Phlius
- Pherecydes of Syros
- Philebus
- Philia
- Philip of Opus
- Philiscus of Aegina
- Philiscus of Thessaly
- Philistus
- Philo
- Philo the Dialectician
- Philo of Larissa
- Philo's Works
- Philo's view of God
- Philodemus
- Philolaus
- Philonides of Laodicea
- John Philoponus
- Philosopher king
- Philostratus
- Phintys
- Phronesis
- Physics (Aristotle)
- Physiognomonics
- Physis
- Pietas (virtue)
- Plank of Carneades
- Plato
- Plato's five regimes
- Plato's four cardinal virtues
- Plato's number
- Plato's tripartite theory of soul
- Platonic Academy
- Platonic epistemology
- Platonic idealism
- Platonic love
- Platonic realism
- Platonism
- Pleonexia
- Pleroma
- Pliny the Younger
- Pliny the Elder
- Plotinus
- Pluralist school
- Plutarch
- Plutarch of Athens
- Pneuma (Stoic)
- Poetics (Aristotle)
- Polemarchus
- Polemon (scholarch)
- Polemon of Athens
- Polemon of Laodicea
- Politeia
- Politics (Aristotle)
- Polity (Aristotle)
- Polus
- Polyaenus of Lampsacus
- Polystratus the Epicurean
- Porphyrian tree
- Porphyry (philosopher)
- Posidonius
- Posterior Analytics
- Potamo of Alexandria
- Potentiality and actuality
- Practical syllogism
- Praxiphanes
- Pre-Socratic philosophy
- Primum movens
- Principle of contradiction
- Prior Analytics
- Priscian of Lydia
- Priscus of Epirus
- Problems (Aristotle)
- Proclus
- Prodicus
- Progression of Animals
- Prohairesis
- Protagoras
- Protagoras (dialogue)
- Proxenus of Atarneus
- Pseudo-Aristotle
- Pseudo-Demikristo
- Pseudo-Dionysius the Areopagite
- Pseudo-Plutarch
- Ptolemy-el-Garib
- Publius Clodius Thrasea Paetus
- Publius Egnatius Celer
- Pyrrho
- Pyrrhonism
- Pythagoras
- Pythagoreanism
- Python of Aenus

Q
Quis custodiet ipsos custodes?

R
Rabirius (Epicurean)
- Rational animal
- Rhetoric (Aristotle)
- Rhetoric to Alexander
- Ring of Gyges
- Rival Lovers
- Rota Fortunae
- Gaius Musonius Rufus

S
Sage (Sophos)
- Sallustius of Emesa
- Samkhyakarika
- Satyrus the Peripatetic
- Scholarch
- School of Names
- Scythianus
- Second Alcibiades
- Second Letter (Plato)
- Secundus the Silent
- Seneca the Younger
- Seneca's Consolations
- Sense and Sensibilia (Aristotle)
- Sensus communis
- Seven Sages of Greece
- Seventh Letter (Plato)
- Quintus Sextius
- Sextus Empiricus
- Sextus of Chaeronea
- Ship of state
- Ship of Theseus
- Prince Shōtoku
- Simmias of Syracuse
- Simmias of Thebes
- Simon the Shoemaker
- Simplicius of Cilicia
- Siro the Epicurean
- Sisyphus (dialogue)
- Socrates
- Socratic dialogue
- Socratic method
- Socratic paradox
- Socratic problem
- Socratici viri
- Aeschines of Sphettus
- Somnium Scipionis
- Sopater of Apamea
- Sophia (wisdom)
- Sophism
- Sophist (dialogue)
- Sophistical Refutations
- Sophos kagathos
- Sophrosyne
- Sosigenes the Peripatetic
- Sosipatra
- Sotades
- Sotion (Pythagorean)
- Species (metaphysics)
- Speusippus
- Sphaerus
- Square of opposition
- Statesman (dialogue)
- Stephanus pagination
- Stilpo
- Stoa Poikile
- Stoic categories
- Stoic passions
- Stoic physics
- Stoicism
- Stoicorum Veterum Fragmenta
- Strato of Lampsacus
- Structure of Plato's Republic
- Substance theory
- Substantial form
- Successions of Philosophers
- Sun Tzu
- Symposium (Plato)
- Symposium (Xenophon)
- Synoecism
- Syrianus

T
Table of Opposites
- Tacitean studies
- Tao Te Ching
- Techne
- Telauges
- Telecles
- Teles of Megara
- Telos (philosophy)
- Tenth Letter (Plato)
- Terebinthus
- Term logic
- Terpsion
- Tertullian
- Tetractys
- Tetrad (Greek philosophy)
- Tetrapharmakos
- Thales
- The Art of War
- The Golden Ass
- The golden verses of Pythagoras
- The Republic (Plato)
- The Republic (Zeno)
- The Situations and Names of Winds
- The Theology of Aristotle
- The True Word
- Theaetetus (dialogue)
- Theagenes of Patras
- Theages
- Theano (philosopher)
- Theia mania
- Themista of Lampsacus
- Themistius
- Theodorus of Asine
- Theodorus of Byzantium
- Theodorus the Atheist
- Theon of Smyrna
- Theophrastus
- Theory of Forms
- Theurgy
- Third man argument
- Thirteen Classics
- Thrasymachus
- Thrasymachus of Corinth
- Thucydides
- Thumos
- Timaeus (dialogue)
- Timaeus the Sophist
- Timaeus of Locri
- Timocrates of Lampsacus
- Timolaus of Cyzicus
- Timon of Phlius
- Timycha
- Tirukkuṛaḷ
- Tiruvalluvar
- Titus Albucius
- Topics (Aristotle)
- Topus Uranus
- Tractatus coislinianus
- Transmigration of the soul
- Triad (Greek philosophy)
- Trial of Socrates
- Tusculanae Disputationes
- Twelfth Letter (Plato)
- Apollonius of Tyana
- Antipater of Tyre

U
Udyotakara
- Unit-point atomism
- Unmoved mover
- Upanishads

V
Vasubandhu
- Virtus (virtue)
- Vyasa

W
Wonhyo
- Writings of Marcus Tullius Cicero

X
Xenarchus of Seleucia
- Xeniades
- Xenocrates
- Xenophanes
- Xenophilus
- Xenophon
- Ximen Bao
- Xun Zi

Y
Yajnavalkya
- Yang Zhu

Z
Zeno of Citium
- Zeno of Elea
- Zeno of Sidon
- Zeno of Tarsus
- Zeno's paradoxes
- Zenobius
- Zenodotus (philosopher)
- Zhuang Zhou
- Zhuangzi (book)
- Zoilus
- Zoroaster
- Zou Yan

See also
 Philosophy
 Lists of philosophy topics

Ancient philosophy